The 2019 Presidential Tour of Turkey was a road cycling stage race, that took place between 16 and 21 April 2019 in Turkey. It was the 55th edition of the Presidential Tour of Turkey and the 17th race of the 2019 UCI World Tour.

Teams
Seventeen teams started the race. Each team had a maximum of seven riders:

Route

Stages

Stage 1
16 April 2019 — Istanbul to Tekirdağ,

Stage 2
17 April 2019 — Tekirdağ to Eceabat,

Stage 3
18 April 2019 — Çanakkale to Edremit,

Stage 4
19 April 2019 — Balıkesir to Bursa,

Stage 5
20 April 2019 — Bursa to Kartepe,

Stage 6
21 April 2019 — Sakarya to Istanbul,

Classification leadership table

Final classification standings

General classification

Points classification

Mountains classification

Teams classification

References

2019
2019 UCI World Tour
2019 in Turkish sport
April 2019 sports events in Turkey